Tangut Components is a Unicode block containing components and radicals used in the modern study of the Tangut script.

Block

History
The following Unicode-related documents record the purpose and process of defining specific characters in the Tangut Components block:

See also 
 Tangut (Unicode block)
 Tangut Supplement (Unicode block)
 Ideographic Symbols and Punctuation (Unicode block)

References 

Unicode blocks
Tangut script